Dragor may refer to:

 Dragør, a town of Region Hovedstaden, Denmark
 Dragør Municipality, a municipality of Region Hovedstaden, Denmark
 Dragor River, in North Macedonia
 Dragor Hill, in Antarctica